The Moonshae Trilogy is a series of novels by Douglas Niles, set in the Forgotten Realms campaign setting. Darkwalker on Moonshae, the first novel in the series, was the very first Forgotten Realms novel ever published.

Plot summary
The Moonshae Trilogy takes place on the Moonshae Isles, and involves a young prince on his way to unite all the people on the islands.

Novels
 Darkwalker on Moonshae (paperback, May 1987, ; paperback re-issue, October 2004)
 Black Wizards (paperback, April 1988, ; paperback re-issue, November 2004)
 Darkwell (paperback, February 1989, ; paperback re-issue, December 2004)

Reviews
Backstab #6

References

 

Fantasy novel series
Forgotten Realms novel series